is the sixth studio album by Japanese idol girl group AKB48.

Promotion and release 
The album was released on January 21, 2015 under King Records in Japan, in several editions: Theater, Type A, and Type B. The Theater edition is only sold at the AKB48 theater. The Type A and Type B editions include 2 CDs, and a limited edition of Type A includes a bonus DVD.

Track listing 
All songs performed by AKB48 except as noted.

Source:

Personnel
Note: This album included the couplings from Kibouteki Refrain.

Juujun na Slave 
Team A: Miyabi Ino, Manami Ichikawa, Anna Iriyama, Karen Iwata, Rina Kawaei, Natsuki Kojima, Haruna Kojima, Haruka Shimazaki, Minami Takahashi, Kayoko Takita, Makiho Tatsuya, Megu Taniguchi, Chisato Nakata, Chiyori Nakanishi, Mariko Nakamura, Rena Nishiyama, Nana Fujita, Nao Furuhata, Ami Maeda, Sakiko Matsui, Sakura Miyawaki, Tomu Muto, Ayaka Morikawa, Fuuko Yagura

Hajimete no Drive 
Team K: Moe Aigasa, Maria Abe, Haruka Ishida, Misaki Iwasa, Mayumi Uchida, Rie Kitahara, Mako Kojima, Haruka Kodama, Kana Kobayashi, Moe Goto, Haruka Shimada, Hinana Shimoguchi, Shihori Suzuki, Mariya Suzuki, Yuka Tano, Mariya Nagao, Jurina Matsui, Miho Miyazaki, Sayaka Yamamoto, Ami Yumoto, Yui Yokoyama

Loneliness Club 
Team B: Rina Ikoma, Rina Izuta, Natsuki Uchiyama, Ayano Umeta, Ryoka Oshima, Shizuka Ōya, Nana Owada, Mayu Ogasawara, Yuki Kashiwagi, Saya Kawamoto, Asuka Kuramochi, Aki Takajo, Juri Takahashi, Miyu Takeuchi, Miku Tanabe, Mio Tomonaga, Wakana Natori, Rena Nozawa, Hikari Hashimoto, Rina Hirata, Seina Fukuoka, Aeri Yokoshima, Mayu Watanabe

Me wo Akete Mama no First Kiss 
Team 4: Saho Iwatate, Rio Okawa, Miyu Omori, Ayaka Okada, Nana Okada, Rena Kato, Yuria Kizaki, Saki Kitazawa, Riho Kotani, Marina Kobayashi, Haruka Komiyama, Yukari Sasaki, Kiara Sato, Ayana Shinozaki, Nagisa Shibuya, Yurina Takashima, Mizuki Tsuchiyasu, Miki Nishino, Mitsuki Maeda, Minami Minegishi, Mion Mukaichi, Yuiri Murayama, Shinobu Mogi

Reborn 
AKB48 Team Surprise
Team A: Natsuki Kojima, Chisato Nakata, Mariko Nakamura, Ami Maeda, Sakiko Matsui, Ayaka Morikawa
Team K: Haruka Ishida, Misaki Iwasa, Mayumi Uchida, Mariya Suzuki, Shihori Suzuki
Team B: Rina Izuta (center), Shizuka Ōya, Miku Tanabe, Wakana Natori
Team 4: Saho Iwatate, Marina Kobayashi, Yukari Sasaki, Ayana Shinozaki

Release history

Chart

References

External links 
King Records
 Theatre Edition profile
 Type-A Limited Edition profile
 Type-A Regular Edition profile
 Type-B profile

2015 albums
AKB48 albums
King Records (Japan) albums
Albums produced by Yasushi Akimoto
Japanese-language albums